Diaporthomycetidae is a subclass of sac fungi under class Sordariomycetes.

The subclass was formed in 2015 for some fungi taxa that were already placed within Sordariomycetidae subclass, but that were phylogenetically and morphologically distinct from genera in Sordariomycetidae. Members of Diaporthomycetidae can occur in both aquatic and terrestrial habitats as saprobes (living on decayed dead or waste organic matter), pathogens, or endophytes (within a plant for at least part of its life cycle without causing apparent disease).

In 2017, there were up to 15 orders and 65 families in this subclass. More orders maybe confirmed in DNA based phylogenetic analysis studies in 2021.

Distribution
Member is the order have a cosmopolitan distribution, including being found in China and Thailand, and parts of Europe.

Orders
As accepted by Wijayawardene et al. 2020;
 Annulatascales - family Annulatascaceae (with 13 genera)
 Atractosporales
 Atractosporaceae (2)
 Conlariaceae (2)
 Pseudoproboscisporaceae (3)
 Calosphaeriales
 Calosphaeriaceae (4)
 Pleurostomataceae (1)
 Diaporthales

 Apiosporopsidaceae (1)
 Apoharknessiaceae (2)
 Asterosporiaceae (1)
 Auratiopycnidiellaceae (1)
 Coryneaceae (2)
 Cryphonectriaceae (27)
 Cytosporaceae (6)
 Diaporthaceae (15)
 Diaporthosporellaceae (1)
 Diaporthostomataceae (1)
 Dwiroopaceae (1)
 Erythrogloeaceae (4)
 Foliocryphiaceae (2)
 Gnomoniaceae (37)
 Harknessiaceae (2)
 Juglanconidaceae (2)
 Lamproconiaceae (2)
 Macrohilaceae (1)
 Mastigosporellaceae  (1)
 Melanconidaceae (1)
 Melanconiellaceae (8)
 Neomelanconiellaceae (1)
 Phaeoappendicosporaceae (2)
 Prosopidicolaceae (1)
 Pseudomelanconidaceae (3)
 Pseudoplagiostomataceae (1)
 Pyrisporaceae  (1)
 Schizoparmaceae (1)
 Stilbosporaceae (4)
 Sydowiellaceae (21)
 Synnemasporellaceae (1)
 Tubakiaceae (8)

 Distoseptisporales - Distoseptisporaceae (1)

 Jobellisiales - Jobellisiaceae (1)

 Magnaporthales
 Ceratosphaeriaceae (1)
 Magnaporthaceae (24)
 Ophioceraceae (2)
 Pseudohalonectriaceae (1)
 Pyriculariaceae (11)

Myrmecridiales
 Myrmecridiaceae (2)
 Xenodactylariaceae (1)

Ophiostomatales
 Kathistaceae (3)
 Ophiostomataceae (12)

Pararamichloridiales - Pararamichloridiaceae (1)

Phomatosporales - Phomatosporaceae (3)

Sporidesmiales - Sporidesmiaceae (1)

Tirisporellales - Tirisporellaceae (3)

Togniniales - Togniniaceae (1)

Xenospadicoidales - Xenospadicoidaceae (5)

Incertae sedis
As accepted by Wijayawardene et al. 2020;

Families
 Barbatosphaeriaceae 
 Barbatosphaeria  (9)
 Ceratostomella  (18)
 Xylomelasma  (4)

 Papulosaceae 
 Brunneosporella  (1)
 Fluminicola  (5)
 Papulosa  (1)
 Wongia  (3)

 Rhamphoriaceae 
 Rhamphoria  (15)
 Rhamphoriopsis  (1)
 Rhodoveronaea  (1)
 Xylolentia  (1)

 Thyridiaceae 
 Pleurocytospora  (3)
 Thyridium  (34)

 Trichosphaeriaceae 
 Aquidictyomyces  (1)*
 Brachysporium  (25)
 Collematospora  (1)
 Coniobrevicolla   (1)
 Eriosphaeria  (24)
 Koorchaloma Subram.  (11)
 Rizalia  (6)
 Schweinitziella  (4)
 Setocampanula  (1)
 Trichosphaeria  (20)
 Unisetosphaeria  (1)

 Woswasiaceae 
 Cyanoannulus  (1)
 Woswasia  (1)
 Xylochrysis  (1)

Genera incertae sedis
 Aquimonospora  (1)
 Aquaticola  (5)
 Fusoidispora  (1)
 Kaarikia  (1)*
 Platytrachelon  (1)
 Proliferophorum  (1)
 Pseudoconlarium  (1)
 Pseudostanjehughesia  (1)

References

Sordariomycetes
Fungus subclasses
Fungus taxa
Taxa described in 2015